(1918—1992) was a Japanese Rinzai roshi and former abbot of Ryōkōin, a subtemple of Daitoku-ji in Kyoto, Japan. A student of the late Daisetz Teitaro Suzuki, Sōhaku was fluent in English  and known to hold regular sesshins until the 1980s which many Americans attended. One of his American students is James H. Austin, author of Zen and the Brain. Austin writes of his teacher, "This remarkable person, Kobori-roshi, inspired me to begin the long path of Zen and stick to it. As a result, I have since continued to repair my ignorance about Zen and its psychophysiology during an ongoing process of adult reeducation."

A collection of dialogue with Kobori Nanrei Sohaku is recently published in Kindle Book Series of Amazon with a title of A DIALOGUE WITH ZEN MASTER, KOBORI NAREI SOHAKU. by one of his followers Dr. Akira Hasegawa, Professor Emeritus, Osaka University, https://en.wikipedia.org/wiki/Akira_Hasegawa   The book was originally published by Tankosha,Kyoto, with a title of  The one world of Lao Tzu and modern physics : a dialogue with a Zen abbot ISBN 4-473-01373-1. OCLC 43475820 (https://www.worldcat.org/oclc/43475820). Most zen masters do not go out to preach although they take a position that the gate is always open. Abbot Kobori is no exception. When the book was originally published by Tankosha, he declined to show his name on the cover. Hasegawa decided republish the book with the title having Mr. Kobori's name on the cover now.

Zen philosophy can not be taught in words.individual is expected to acquire the spirit through Zazen meditation. Hasegawa, a physicist, never exercised zazen seriously but through a large numbers of conversations that very fortunately he could have with the abbot, he, the author of the book, has a feeling that. he could touch the spirit of zen. that the reader may be able to share.with 　The way of Zen is through zazen meditation.  It cannot be taught in words.  Nevertheless, through his many conversations with the Abbot, Hasegawa, a physicist, felt touched by the spirit of Zen and grateful for the Abbot's insights, a good fortune that he wanted to share with others.

Notes

References

Rinzai Buddhists
Zen Buddhist abbots
1918 births
1992 deaths
Japanese Zen Buddhists
Rōshi
20th-century Buddhist monks